Kaikaifilu is a genus of mosasaur from the Late Cretaceous part of the Lopez de Bertodano Formation of Antarctica, just before the Cretaceous–Paleogene extinction event. It is thought to be among the largest members of the tylosaurines, a group of marine lizards that lived during the Cretaceous, and the only really large Antarctic tylosaurine. However, some researchers disagree with this classification.

Description 
The sutures in the skull are fused, the ectepicondyle and entepicondyle (ridges on the humerus that provide muscle attachment sites) are well-developed, and the internal texture of the bone is relatively dense, suggesting that this individual was an adult.

Asides from its size, a unique combination of other traits distinguish Kaikaifilu from its relatives. There is a prominent ridge in front of the top margin of the eye socket, and there is also a ridge between the two nostrils (unlike Taniwhasaurus). The shape of the frontal bone also differs from that of Moanasaurus and Rikisaurus, being triangular and contacting the pineal foramen and the naris; additionally, the width of the skull contracts in front of the eye socket, and the head of the humerus is vertically very thick.

Notably, the teeth of Kaikaifilu are heterodont, meaning that there is more than one distinct type of teeth: medium-sized conical teeth without any wear facets; medium-sized conical teeth with two or three wear facets on their outside and inside surfaces; very large conical teeth without any wear facets; and small, relatively blunt teeth with D-shaped cross-sections and soft enamel (which probably represent growing teeth). The only other heterodont mosasaur known is Eremiasaurus. It is not known why Kaikaifilu or Eremiasaurus were heterodont unlike their closer relatives, but it is probably due to an unusual diet.

Discovery and naming 
In January 2011, the Chilean Paleontological Expedition collected a large mosasaur skull, associated jaw fragments, a partial humerus, and about 30 isolated teeth from the upper layers of the Lopez de Bertodano Formation on Seymour Island, Antarctica.

Unlike other remains of vertebrates found on Seymour Island, the fossils had a yellowish color, suggesting that the minerals in the specimen had been consistently altered. By the time the specimen was found, it was badly weathered, and the skull, which was preserved right-side-up, was split into several blocks. Several parts of the skull are only present as casts.

The specimen was named Kaikaifilu hervei in honour of "Kai-Kai filú" (a reptilian ocean deity in the cosmology of the Mapuche people) and Dr. Francisco Hervé (a Chilean geologist who has contributed significantly to the study of Chilean and Antarctic geology).

Classification 
Several phylogenetic analyses were conducted in 2016 to determine the relationships of Kaikaifilu. All of them showed that it was closely related to Tylosaurus and Taniwhasaurus in the Tylosaurinae. The results of one of four analyses conducted are shown below in a phylogenetic tree. In recent years, however, because the holotype is extremely fragmentary and exhibits no exclusively tylosaurine features, with many features contradicting the tylosaurine diagnosis, some researchers don't agree with this classification.

Paleobiology 
Previously-identified mosasaur genera from the Lopez de Bertodano Formation include Mosasaurus, Prognathodon, Plioplatecarpus, Moanasaurus, and Liodon. However, since they were based on teeth, some of which match the tooth morphologies found in Kaikaifilu, it is very possible that not all of these genera were actually present. This might make some sense, as it is unusual to have so many large predators living in the same ecosystem. Kaikaifilu also lived alongside the aristonectine plesiosaur Aristonectes, and would probably have eaten Aristonectes if it had the chance to.

References 

Mosasaurids
Maastrichtian life
Prehistoric reptiles of Antarctica
Cretaceous Antarctica
Fossils of Antarctica
Fossil taxa described in 2016